The Petite rivière Vermillon is a tributary of the west bank of the Jeannotte River, flowing in the municipality of Lac-Édouard (canton of Bickerdike) and of La Tuque (township of Charest and Laurier), in the administrative region of Mauricie, in province of Quebec, in Canada.

The course of the “Petite Rivière Vermillon” descends from the west side of the Batiscan river and from the east side of the Saint-Maurice River. This river is part of the hydrographic side of the Batiscan River which generally winds south to the north bank of the St. Lawrence River.

The course of the "Petite Rivière Vermillon" descends entirely into the forest zone. The river surface is generally frozen from mid-December until the end of March.

Since the middle of the 19th century, forestry has been the predominant activity of the "Petite Rivière Vermillon" watershed.

Geography 
The "Petite Rivière Vermillon" has its source in a forest area, at the mouth of Lac au Bouquet.

Upper course of the river (segment of )

  south-west in the canton of Bickerdike, to the north-east shore of Lac Eugène;
  towards the South-West, crossing Lake Eugène at the start of the segment on its full length, then the Algonquin Lake on  until 'at its mouth. Note: Algonguin Lake straddles the township of Bickerdike (Lac-Édouard) and the township of Charest (La Tuque);
  towards the South-East, passing between two mountains, then crossing Lake Stanislas until its mouth;
  towards the South-East by crossing the "Small Lac Écarté" over its full length, up to its mouth;

Lower river (segment of )

  eastwards, to the limit of the township of Laurier;
  to the south in the marsh area, meandering to the confluence of the river.

The "Petite Rivière Vermillon" flows into the township of Laurier in the town of La Tuque on the north shore of Lac du Castor which is crossed in its eastern part by the Jeannotte River.

The confluence of the "Petite Rivière Vermillon" is located at:
  North-West of the confluence of the Jeannotte River;
  south of the village center of Lac-Édouard;
  east of downtown La Tuque.

Toponymy 
The toponym "Petite rivière Vermillon" was formalized on December 5, 1968, at the Commission de toponymie du Québec.

See also 
 List of rivers of Quebec

References 

Landforms of La Tuque, Quebec
Rivers of Mauricie